The women's 3000 metres steeplechase event at the 2004 African Championships in Athletics was held in Brazzaville, Republic of the Congo on July 16. This marked the first time that this event was held for women at the African Championships.

Results

References
Results

2004 African Championships in Athletics
Steeplechase at the African Championships in Athletics
2004 in women's athletics